Ndolou is a department of Ngounié Province in south-western Gabon. The capital lies at Mandji. It had a population of 5,727 in 2013.

Towns and villages

References

Ngounié Province
Departments of Gabon